Alvania planciusi is a species of minute sea snail, a marine gastropod mollusk or micromollusk in the family Rissoidae.

Description

Distribution

References

 Rolán E., 2005. Malacological Fauna From The Cape Verde Archipelago. Part 1, Polyplacophora and Gastropoda.
 Templado, J.; Rolán, E. (1994 ["1993"]). Las especies del género Crisilla y afines (Gastropoda: Prosobranchia: Rissoidea) en el archipiélago de Cabo Verde. Iberus. 11(2): 1-25

External links
 Moolenbeek R.G. & Rolán E. (1988). New species of Rissoidae from the Cape Verde Islands (Mollusca: Gastropoda) part 1. Bulletin Zoölogisch Museum. 11(14): 121-126

Rissoidae
Gastropods described in 1988